Equalism is a socioeconomic theory based upon the idea that emerging technologies will put an end to social stratification through even distribution of resources in the technological singularity era. It originates from the work of Inessa Lee, the futurist writer and ideologist of California Transhumanist Party, published in "The Transhumanism Handbook" by Newton Lee.

Theory 
According to the equalism theory, social stratification is a result of uneven distribution of resources on the planet. It is the major reason for human suffering, riots and wars. Therefore, in order to end poverty and achieve world peace, wealth and resources should be distributed evenly. Technology and science are the tools of equalism assisting its purpose. AI governance will put an end to socioeconomic inequality and diseases.

Equalism is the highest stage of capitalism development. It’s part of the Transhumanism revolution, bloodless and inevitable, like the technological progress itself.

References 

Transhumanism